Bucknell is a civil parish in Shropshire, England.  The parish contains 30 listed buildings that are recorded in the National Heritage List for England.  All the listed buildings are designated at Grade II, the lowest of the three grades, which is applied to "buildings of national importance and special interest".  The parish contains the village of Bucknell and the surrounding countryside.  Most of the listed buildings are in the village, and a high number of them are basically timber framed and date from the 14th to 17th centuries; these include houses, cottages, farmhouses and farm buildings.  The other listed buildings are a church, an ice house, a railway station and a telephone kiosk.


Buildings

References

Citations

Sources

Lists of buildings and structures in Shropshire